Lukáš Pabiška (born February 24, 1984) is a Czech professional ice hockey player. He played with BK Mladá Boleslav in the Czech Extraliga during the 2010–11 Czech Extraliga season.

References

External links

1984 births
Living people
BK Mladá Boleslav players
Czech ice hockey forwards
Sportspeople from Liberec
HC Berounští Medvědi players
HC Vítkovice players
HC Bílí Tygři Liberec players
HC Benátky nad Jizerou players